Cockersand Abbey chapter house is a  mausoleum in the English village of Thurnham, Lancashire. A Grade I listed building and formerly part of Cockersand Abbey, it dates to 1230. It was used as a family mausoleum by the Daltons of Thurnham Hall during the 18th and 19th centuries. The land was acquired by the Daltons shortly after 1556, when Robert Dalton married Ann Kitchen.

Cockersand Abbey has existed from the late 12th century. The building is constructed of red sandstone rubble and has a slate roof. Its plan is octagonal although the west side has been squared off. At some point (probably the mid-18th century) it was converted into a family burial chamber.

See also

Listed buildings in Thurnham, Lancashire

References

Sources

Grade I listed buildings in Lancashire
1230 establishments in England
Mausoleums in England